Shine Group was an international television production and distribution group with 26 production companies across 12 countries creating scripted and non-scripted content in the global marketplace.

Shine Group companies included award-winning genre specialists such as U.K.-based Kudos (drama), Dragonfly (factual), Princess Productions (entertainment and multi-genre) and Shine TV (factual and factual entertainment); U.S. producer Shine America (formerly Reveille); and Metronome Film & Television, the Nordic region’s largest production group. The group also includes Shine 360°, a group-wide ancillary and commercial rights division, Shine International, the dedicated international sales and distribution arm and unscripted formats division Shine Network.

Shine International distributed a catalogue of more than 4,000 hours of broadcast content to more than 200 territories worldwide as of the end of 2013. Internationally distributed shows from the Shine group include MasterChef (now produced in over 40 territories), The Biggest Loser, One Born Every Minute, Minute to Win It and crime drama The Bridge, which was adapted in both the U.S., and the U.K. and France in 2013.

Shine has established businesses in Germany, France, Australia, Spain and Portugal and has expanded into the children’s genre in a joint venture with Teletubbies and In The Night Garden co-creator Andy Davenport. Shine also has a digital and direct to consumer business through social gaming producer Bossa Studios and the online original content producers, ChannelFlip Media.

History
Shine was founded in 2001 by Elisabeth Murdoch following her departure from BSkyB the previous year. In 2006, Shine Group acquired Kudos, Princess Productions and Dragonfly to create the Shine Group, although they still operate as four separate entities.

Shine acquired Reveille Productions in 2008. News Corporation (later 21st Century Fox, but assets are now split between The Walt Disney Company and Fox Corporation) acquired Shine Group in April 2011 for $415 million. US pension funds who are shareholders in News Corporation are suing the company accusing Murdoch of nepotism.

In May 2014, 21st Century Fox and Apollo Global Management announced the negotiation of merging their respective production companies: FOX-owned Shine Group and Apollo-controlled Endemol and CORE Media Group. The deal was finalized later in the same year.

On 17 December 2014, Shine Group announced the joint venture by 21st Century Fox with funds managed by affiliates of Apollo Global Management, LLC, combining Endemol, Shine and CORE Media into Endemol Shine Group. As part of the new structure, Former Endemol UK CEO, Lucas Church, has been appointed Chairman of Endemol Shine UK, whilst former Endemol UK Chief Operating Officer, Richard Johnston, becomes CEO of Endemol Shine UK.

Subsidiaries

Current

Europe 

 Shine Iberia
 Endemol Portugal

Former (from 2015, is the part of Endemol Shine Group)

UK

Brown Eyed Boy: Opened for business in 2002-05-27, it was set up by Gary Reich after leaving the BBC and Chrysalis Entertainment.
Bossa Studios: In 2011-09-06, Shine Group announced the acquisition of Bossa Studios.
ChannelFlip Media Ltd: In 2012-01-06, Shine Group announced the acquisition of ChannelFlip.
Dragonfly
Kudos
Lovely Day: Founded in 2010 by Diederick Santer with Kudos.
Princess Productions
Shine TV
Shine North
Shine International
Shine Network: Shine Group's internal formats division responsible for driving and managing the international roll out of our global formats.
Shine 360°: Group wide brand and rights management division of the Shine Group.
Shine Pictures: Shine Group's feature film division. Became part of Kudos in 2015.
START: In 2011-11-02, IGN announced the launch of "START", a new YouTube video games channel, in early 2012 by IGN Entertainment and Shine Group.

Americas

Shine America: In 2012-03-16, Shine Group announced the unveiling of Shine America.
Ardaban: In 2012-03-06, Shine America announced the launch of Ardaban, with appointment of former Notional Co-President Chachi Senior as Ardaban CEO.

Nordics

Shine Nordics AB: Joined Shine Group in 2009 as Metronome Film & Television AB. In 2014-04-05, Shine Group announced renaming Metronome Film & Television AB to Shine Nordics AB.
Friday TV AB (Sweden)
Filmlance International AB (Sweden)
Meter Television AB (Sweden)
Metronome Denmark (Metronome Productions A/S)
Shine Finland Oy (Finland)
Metronome Spartacus AS (Norway)
Rubicon TV AS (Norway)
Studios A/S (Denmark)
STO-CPH Produktion AB (Sweden)
Metronome Rental (Sweden)
HEARTLAND ApS (Denmark)
Metronome Post AB (Sweden)
Mag5 Content AB (Sweden)

Europe

Shine France
Shine Germany

Australia

Shine Australia (Shine (Aust) Pty Ltd): Formed in January 2010.

Programming

MasterChef Junior
The Undriveables
Grantchester
Humans
Restaurant Startup
Prodigies
Stripped
Anything Goes
Arne Dahl
Best Bakery
Beauty and the Geek
The Biggest Loser
The Bridge
Broadchurch
Bron
Clash of the Choirs
The Face
Got to Dance
Gracepoint
The Island
Lilyhammer
MasterChef
Minute To Win It
One Born Every Minute
Sandhamn Murders
Saturday Night Tube
Secret Street Crew
The Tunnel
Vicious
Utopia

References

External links

 
Former News Corporation subsidiaries
Former subsidiaries of The Walt Disney Company